The Ostzonenmeisterschaft 1949 (English: Championship of the Eastern Zone) was the second association football championship in what was to become East Germany. As in the previous season, it was played in a one-leg knock-out format with ten participating teams. Each of the five Länder—Mecklenburg-Vorpommern, Brandenburg, Saxony, Thuringia and Saxony-Anhalt—sent two representatives. Unlike the previous season, none of the regional championships was ended early, even if the participants for the championship had already been determined. Last year's winner SG Planitz did not qualify, but finalists SG Freiimfelde Halle – renamed ZSG Union Halle – reached the final again, this time beating Fortuna Erfurt to win their first championship.

Teams qualified for the play-offs

Play-offs

Qualifying round

Quarter finals

Semi finals

Final

References
RSSSF

German football championship
1948–49 in German football